Mercedes-Benz, a brand of the Mercedes-Benz Group, has been involved in Formula One as both team owner and engine manufacturer for various periods since 1954. The Mercedes-AMG Petronas F1 Team, which is based in Brackley, England, and possesses a German licence,  majority owned by the Mercedes-Benz Group with Toto Wolff having a significant shareholding. Mercedes-branded teams are often referred to by the nickname, the "Silver Arrows". An announcement was made in December 2020 that Ineos planned to take a one third equal ownership stake alongside the Mercedes-Benz Group and Wolff; this came into effect on 25 January 2022.

Before the Second World War, Mercedes-Benz competed in the European Championship, winning three titles. Despite winning two Drivers' Championships, Mercedes-Benz withdrew from motor racing after 1955 in response to the 1955 Le Mans disaster.

The company won one constructors' title and three drivers' titles in a works partnership with McLaren which lasted until 2009. In 2005, Ilmor was rebranded as Mercedes AMG High Performance Powertrains. In , the company bought the Brawn GP team, rebranding it as Mercedes. It has set records for most wins in a season (19 in ), and for most consecutive constructors' titles. The manufacturer has also collected more than 200 wins as an engine supplier and is ranked second in Formula One history. Ten Constructors' and thirteen Drivers' Championships have been won with Mercedes-Benz engines.

Constructor

Grand Prix racing before Formula One (1930s)
Mercedes-Benz formerly competed in Grand Prix motor racing in the 1930s, when the Silver Arrows dominated the races alongside rivals Auto Union. Both teams were heavily funded by the Nazi regime, winning all European Grand Prix Championships after 1934, of which Rudolf Caracciola won three for Mercedes-Benz.

Daimler-Benz AG (1954–1955)
In 1954, Mercedes-Benz returned to what was now known as Formula One (a World Championship having been established in 1950) under the leadership of Alfred Neubauer, using the technologically advanced Mercedes-Benz W196. The car was run in both the conventional open-wheeled configuration and a streamlined form, which featured covered wheels and wider bodywork. Juan Manuel Fangio, the 1951 champion, transferred mid-season from Maserati to Mercedes-Benz for their debut at the French Grand Prix on 4 July 1954. The team had immediate success and recorded a 1–2 victory with Fangio and Karl Kling, as well as the fastest lap (Hans Herrmann). Fangio went on to win three more races in 1954, winning the championship.

The success continued into the  season, with Mercedes-Benz developing the W196 throughout the year. Mercedes-Benz again dominated the season, with Fangio taking four races, and his new teammate Stirling Moss winning the British Grand Prix. Fangio and Moss finished first and second in that year's championship. The 1955 disaster at the 24 Hours of Le Mans on 11 June, which killed Mercedes-Benz sportscar driver Pierre Levegh and more than 80 spectators led to the cancellations of the French, German, Spanish, and Swiss Grands Prix. At the end of the season, the team withdrew from motor sport, including Formula One. During this first period of the team's participation in Formula One, Mercedes won 9 races in total, including three Grands Prix (the 1954 French Grand Prix, 1954 Italian Grand Prix and 1955 Italian Grand Prix) won by the streamlined "Type Monza", making them the only three races won by a closed-wheel car in Formula One history.

Mercedes-AMG Petronas Formula One Team (2010–present) 
Before the start of the 2010 season Mercedes-Benz's parent company Daimler AG bought a minority stake (45.1%) in the Brawn GP team with Aabar Investments purchasing 30% on 16 November 2009. Following the purchase of the team, as well as a sponsorship deal with Petronas, the team was rebranded as Mercedes GP Petronas Formula One Team, and Mercedes would now compete in the constructors' championship for the first time. Ross Brawn continued his duties as team principal and the team retained its base and workforce in Brackley, close to the Mercedes-Benz Formula One engine plant (formerly Ilmor Engineering) in Brixworth.

BAR, who had formed a partnership with Honda, eventually became Honda Racing F1 Team in 2006 when British American Tobacco withdrew from the sport. It again changed hands in 2008, when Honda withdrew, and was purchased by the team's management, naming it Brawn GP after team principal Ross Brawn. Brawn used engines from Mercedes-Benz High Performance Engines, and despite running on a low budget, Jenson Button won six of the first seven races and ultimately the  Drivers' Championship, while Brawn won the Constructors' Championship. It was the first time in the sport's sixty-year history that a team won both titles in its maiden season.
Team Mercedes GP hired German drivers Nico Rosberg, and seven-time world champion Michael Schumacher, who returned to Formula One after a three-year absence, and Nick Heidfeld as the test and reserve driver. Of Brawn's 2009 drivers, Jenson Button signed for McLaren, whilst Rubens Barrichello moved to Rosberg's former seat with Williams team for 2010. With the acquisition of Brawn, the team ended its involvement with McLaren, parent company Daimler AG sold back the 40% shareholding in the McLaren Group, while continuing to supply engines to the team. The team's performance during 2010 was not so competitive as under Brawn, with the team behind the leading three teams of Ferrari, McLaren, and Red Bull. Their best results came from Rosberg finishing on the podium three times, scoring third places at Sepang, Shanghai, and Silverstone. Ultimately, the team finished fourth in the Constructors' Championship, with 214 points.

Prior to the start of the 2011 season, Daimler and Aabar purchased the remaining 24.9% stake owned by the team management in February 2011. Using the new MGP W02, the  ended when Schumacher and Rosberg both retired due to crash damage on laps 19 and 22 respectively. In Malaysia, Rosberg qualified ninth and Schumacher again failed to make Q3, qualifying eleventh. Schumacher scored the team's first points of the season with a ninth-place finish, whereas Rosberg had a quiet race and finished twelfth. In China, Rosberg and Schumacher showed strong form, with Rosberg finishing fifth as well as leading fourteen laps during the race, while Schumacher ended the race in eighth place. Rosberg added another fifth place in Turkey, while in Spain, Schumacher finished in sixth place, ahead of Rosberg.
In Valencia, Rosberg finished seventh, and Schumacher seventeenth, after contact with Vitaly Petrov. Rosberg and Schumacher both finished in the points at the following two races in Great Britain and Germany. Again, the team finished fourth in the Constructors' Championship just as in 2010, with 165 points with no wins, podiums, or poles.

For 2012, the team removed the GP from their name and added the name of AMG, the high performance brand of Daimler AG, to their title. The team would officially get the designation Mercedes AMG Petronas F1 Team. At the start of the season Mercedes was the subject of protest over the use of a "radical" rear wing concept on the Mercedes F1 W03 racing car, which was not settled until the third race in China when the stewards unanimously rejected the protest. The team secured its first win in 57 years when Nico Rosberg finished first in the 2012 Chinese Grand Prix. At the 2012 Monaco Grand Prix, Michael Schumacher set the fastest time in qualifying, but started sixth after a five-place grid penalty was imposed for having caused an avoidable collision with Bruno Senna during the Spanish Grand Prix, the previous round. In addition to that, Rosberg became the first German driver to win a Grand Prix driving a German vehicle since Hermann Lang's victory at the 1939 Swiss Grand Prix. On 28 September 2012, it was announced that McLaren driver Lewis Hamilton would join the Mercedes team from the  season onwards, having signed a three-year deal to partner Nico Rosberg in the team. In January 2013, Toto Wolff became an executive director of the Mercedes AMG Petronas Formula One Team, with his business partner Rene Berger becoming non-executive director. In addition to joining the team as managing partner, he also acquired 30% of Mercedes-Benz Grand Prix Ltd, with a further 10% held by Niki Lauda, chairman of the board, and 60% by the parent company.
Wolff took over the co-ordination of all Mercedes-Benz motorsport activities, a responsibility previously held by Norbert Haug.

The following season on 26 May 2013, Nico Rosberg capitalised on a pole position to award the team its first win of 2013 at the Monaco Grand Prix. Paddy Lowe moved to the team as executive director on 3 June 2013. Mercedes then went on to take third place in the Canadian Grand Prix courtesy of Hamilton, followed by another win for Rosberg at the British Grand Prix after the team took 1–2 in qualifying. The team then celebrated their third win of the season after Hamilton took his first victory for the team at the Hungarian Grand Prix, resulting in second place ahead of Ferrari in the Constructors' Championship.

Eight consecutive constructors titles (2014–2021) 
Rosberg won the first race of the season in Australia, then in Malaysia, Hamilton completed a grand slam – leading every lap from pole position, with the fastest race lap – while Rosberg completed a 1–2 finish for the team; it ended Hamilton's nine race streak without a podium finish, and was the first 1–2 finish by Mercedes as a works team since the 1955 Italian Grand Prix. The team repeated the result at the Bahrain, the Chinese, and the Spanish Grands Prix, while Rosberg and Hamilton finished 1–2 respectively at the Monaco and Austrian Grands Prix. At the Russian Grand Prix the team won their first Constructors' Championship as a works team. Hamilton won the last race of the season, held in Abu Dhabi. He finished the season 67 points ahead of Rosberg, clinching the World Drivers' Championship. The team finished the 2014 season 296 points ahead of their closest rival Red Bull Racing in the World Constructors' Championship standings. With 18 pole positions, 16 wins and 11 1–2s out of 19 races, Mercedes dominated this first year of the V6 turbo era. For their 16 race victories, the average winning margin to the nearest non-Mercedes competitor was 23.2 seconds.

For the  season, the team retained both Hamilton and Rosberg. At the 2015 Russian Grand Prix the team won their second Constructors' Championship as a works team and Hamilton won his second consecutive Drivers' Championship at the 2015 United States Grand Prix, finishing 59 points ahead of Rosberg. Mercedes continued their domination in this second year of the V6 turbo era, improving on their impressive numbers from 2014 with 18 pole positions, 16 wins and 12 1–2s in 19 races. Of their 16 race victories, the average winning margin to the nearest non-Mercedes competitor was 19.7 seconds, down from 23.2 seconds in 2014.

In the  season, Mercedes won the Constructors' Championship for the third consecutive season, winning 19 of the 21 races held, while securing 20 poles (the highest percentage ever in a single season of F1 at 95.2%) and 8 1–2s. The average winning gap to the nearest non-Mercedes driver dropped to 14.6 seconds. Rosberg won his only Drivers' Championship, finishing 5 points ahead of Hamilton, before announcing his retirement shortly after winning the title.

On 10 January 2017, Mercedes announced that Executive Director Paddy Lowe had left the team, and entered a period of garden leave. On 16 January 2017, Valtteri Bottas was announced as Rosberg's replacement for the  season and British GP3 driver George Russell was incorporated into the junior team. On 22 October 2017, Mercedes won the Constructors' Championship for the fourth consecutive time. One week later, Lewis Hamilton became the first British driver to win four world championships. Mercedes finished the 2017 season with 12 wins out of 20 races, 15 poles, 4 1–2s and an average winning margin to the nearest non-Mercedes driver of 13.1 seconds.

For the 2018 season the team retained both Hamilton and Bottas. The team clinched their fifth straight constructors' title at the penultimate race of the season in Brazil after a win for Hamilton. In the 2018 season, Mercedes won 11 races (all for Hamilton) out of 21 races, took 10 fastest laps (three for Hamilton and seven for Bottas), 13 pole positions (eleven for Hamilton and two for Bottas), and four 1–2 finishes. This made Mercedes only the second team in the history in F1 to achieve the feat of winning 5 drivers' and constructors' titles in a row, after Ferrari did so between 2000 and 2004.

For the 2019 season, the team again retained both Hamilton and Bottas. In the opening race, both drivers locked out the front row with Hamilton taking pole position. Bottas overtook Hamilton at the start and took his first victory since the 2017 Abu Dhabi Grand Prix, with Hamilton managing to give the team a 1–2 finish after fending off Red Bull's Max Verstappen.  The team continued the strong performance through the first half of the season.  By the summer break, Mercedes had won 10 out of 12 races with Hamilton taking 8 victories to Bottas's 2, securing 1–2 finishes at the first 5 races of the season. The team would go on to take both the drivers and constructors titles for the sixth consecutive year.

The team debuted their "Dual-Axis-Steering" system during pre-season testing for the  season. This allows the driver to change the toe of the front wheels by pushing or pulling on the steering wheel. This allows the driver to optimise the car for better tyre warming on the straights with zero toe, or better mechanical grip in the corners with positive toe. The system was allowed for the 2020 season, but has been made illegal for 2021. The team would go on to win both the drivers and constructors championships. Before the penultimate round of the season, the 2020 Sakhir Grand Prix, Hamilton was forced to sit the race out following a positive coronavirus test, with Williams driver and Mercedes junior George Russell replacing him.

For 2021, the team retained the same driver line-up for a fifth straight season. The team failed to win the drivers' championship for the first time in the V6 turbo-hybrid era, with Hamilton being overtaken by title rival Max Verstappen on the last lap of the season-ending Abu Dhabi Grand Prix, after a controversial safety car restart. Hamilton had comfortably led the race and been on course for his eighth title before a late safety car. The actions of FIA race director Michael Masi surrounding the controversial procedures used during the late safety car caused Mercedes to file an intention to appeal the results of that race, though this was later withdrawn. Hamilton finished second in the championship, eight points behind champion Verstappen, with Bottas third in the standings in his final season with the team. The team took the constructors' title for a record-extending eighth consecutive season.

Struggling with ground effect (2022)

Mercedes junior driver, George Russell replaced Bottas to partner Hamilton for 2022. 2022 saw major rule changes, which reintroduced ground effect. Mercedes revealed a radical design with what was dubbed 'zero-pods'. The radical design has yet to pay dividends with the team struggling to understand and unlock the full potential. Additionally, the car suffered from aggressive porpoising, the porpoising was significantly reduced and "solved" ahead of the Canadian Grand Prix. Despite their performance struggles, Mercedes' reliability was "amazing", meaning their only three retirements of the season came at the British Grand Prix, where Russell was involved in a crash with Zhou Guanyu and Pierre Gasly, the Belgian Grand Prix, where Hamilton was involved in a crash with Fernando Alonso, and the Abu Dhabi Grand Prix, where Hamilton suffered a mechanical failure, but was still classified 18th. The team regularly appeared on the podium. At the French Grand Prix, Hamilton finished second while Russell finished third, marking the team's first double podium of the season. Russell achieved his first ever pole position, and Mercedes' first of the season, at the Hungarian Grand Prix. Russell achieved his first Formula One win, and Mercedes' first of the season, along with Hamilton coming in second, at the São Paulo Grand Prix.

Engine supplier

After acquisition by Mercedes, the company is now called Mercedes AMG High Performance Powertrains. In , Mercedes also became suppliers of Brawn GP (later acquired to become the Mercedes-Benz factory team) and Force India, later known as Racing Point and eventually, Aston Martin F1. A fourth team was added to the supplying program in 2014, Williams. The 20-year long partnership with McLaren ended in advance of the  season, before resuming in 2021.

For the 2023 season, Mercedes will supply engines to Aston Martin F1, McLaren, and Williams, in addition to themselves.

Junior team
There have been ten drivers linked to the Mercedes junior team, of which seven are still members, :

Current drivers

Former drivers
There are three former drivers of the Mercedes junior team. All three have driven in Formula One. , George Russell is the only driver to have driven for Mercedes, having done so since 2022. Esteban Ocon is the only other former driver to participate in the 2022 season.

Sponsorships
In December 2009, the team suffered an early setback when it was discovered that a planned £80m sponsorship arrangement that had been signed by Brawn with Henkel in July was invalid. Henkel claimed they were unaware of the deal and had no interest in Formula One; the deal allegedly was made by a former Henkel employee on stolen company stationery for the purposes of defrauding the company. On 22 December, Henkel announced that the dispute with the team had been resolved with a mutual agreement and that legal action would not be pursued, although the team would work with the German prosecutor's office to clarify the matter. 

On 21 December, the team confirmed that the number one Malaysian oil and gas company Petronas would join the team as title sponsor. Petronas was based in Kuala Lumpur where the Sepang International Circuit (SIC) is located. From 2010, the team competed under the full title of Mercedes GP Petronas Formula One Team. According to some reports, the arrangement is valued at €30m each year. On 28 September 2022, Mercedes and Petronas announced a multi-year renewal of the title and technical partnership from the 2026 season onwards.

On 25 January 2010, the team's livery was unveiled publicly at the Mercedes-Benz Museum in Stuttgart, with Schumacher and Rosberg in attendance. The cars race in the traditional silver colours of Mercedes-Benz and retains Brawn GP sponsor MIGfx. In 2013, the team signed a multi-year deal with mobile company BlackBerry which ended after the 2015 season. The team also had other major partners such as Monster Energy, Puma, Swissquote (until 2014). Qualcomm, UBS, Epson, Bose & Hugo Boss were added as sponsors in 2015, while Wihuri joined Mercedes together with Bottas in 2017. Before the 2017 Bahrain Grand Prix, Mercedes added software company Tibco as one of their partners. In 2018, Tommy Hilfiger took over from Hugo Boss as the team's clothing supplier with Hamilton becoming a brand ambassador for the company and participating in the #WhatsYourDrive Promotion.
For 2019, the team made a global partnership with CrowdStrike and Marriott Bonvoy. For the 2020 Formula One World Championship, the team welcomed two new partners; Ineos and AMD. In 2021, the team signed a sponsorship deal with TeamViewer, a German technology company, which became the first partner of both Mercedes F1 and FE teams and also partners with FTX a Bahamas-based cryptocurrency exchange company.

Racing record

 Constructors' Championships winning percentage: 
 Drivers' Championships winning percentage: 
 Winning percentage: 

(Bold indicates championships won.)

* Season still in progress.

Esports

See also
 Mercedes AMG High Performance Powertrains, manufacturer of Mercedes-Benz's Formula One engines.
 Mercedes-Benz in motorsport, Daimler AG has entered Mercedes-Benz into other forms of motorsport.

Footnotes

References

External links

 

1954 establishments in West Germany
1955 disestablishments in West Germany
2009 establishments in the United Kingdom
Mercedes-Benz in motorsport
 
Formula One entrants
Formula One engine manufacturers
German auto racing teams
Companies based in Northamptonshire
British companies established in 2009
Auto racing teams established in 1954
Auto racing teams disestablished in 1955
Auto racing teams established in 2009
Laureus World Sports Awards winners
Brackley
Formula One World Constructors' Champions